Koroli is a rural locality (a selo) and the administrative center of Korolinsky Selsoviet of Oktyabrsky District, Amur Oblast, Russia. The population was 207 as of 2018. There are 4 streets.

Geography 
Koroli is located 17 km north of Yekaterinoslavka (the district's administrative centre) by road. Georgiyevka is the nearest rural locality.

References 

Rural localities in Oktyabrsky District, Amur Oblast